Thomas Chippendale, the younger (1749–1822) was an English artist, furniture maker and designer, and the eldest of Thomas Chippendale's eleven children. He was devoted to his father and worked with Chippendale Senior until the later died in 1779. Thereafter he took over his father's business until Thomas Chippendale Jnr was obliged to close the doors on the family business.  The company, listed in Sheraton's The Cabinet Directory of 1803, went bankrupt in 1804 but was later re-established. 
Thomas Chippendale was also a member of the Society of Arts and exhibited his paintings at the Royal Academy of Arts between 1784 and 1801.

References

External links
Chippendale Society

1749 births
1822 deaths
British cabinetmakers
18th-century English painters
English male painters
19th-century English painters
19th-century English male artists
18th-century English male artists